Gibson Island may refer to:

Australia 

 Gibson Island (Houtman Abrolhos, in the Indian Ocean), Western Australia
 Gibson Island, Queensland, an island in the Brisbane River in Brisbane

Canada 

 Gibson Island (Nunavut)

United States 

 Gibson Island (Maryland)
 Gibson Islands (Alaska)